Marvin Karawana (born 30 July 1986, in Wainuiomata, New Zealand) is a professional rugby union and rugby league player. He currently plays for Wellington in the National Rugby sevens competition in New Zealand. He previously played for the Newcastle Knights in the National Rugby League.

Playing career
Karawana attended St. Bernard's College in Wellington and is a Wainuiomata Lions junior.

Karawana made his first grade debut for the Newcastle Knights during the Round 9 encounter with the New Zealand Warriors on 12 May 2007. Karawana pushed his way into the first grade team in 2009 and was used off the interchange bench as a Utility player.

He unfortunately tore his anterior cruciate ligament (ACL) in a NSW Cup trial game in the 2010 pre-season which ruled him out of the entire 2010 season.

In 2011, he made his return to the NRL against the St. George Illawarra Dragons in Round 4.

After the conclusion of the 2011 season, Karawana was released by the Knights.

He returned to New Zealand in 2012 to play Rugby sevens for Wellington in the national competition. He has been nicknamed by his teammates "Wainui SBW", due to his similar propensity to offload the ball in the tackle.

References

External links
2011 Newcastle Knights profile
Rugby League Project stats

1986 births
Living people
New Zealand rugby league players
New Zealand rugby union players
New Zealand Māori rugby league players
Newcastle Knights players
Maitland Pickers players
Central Coast Centurions players
Hawke's Bay rugby union players
Rugby league locks
Rugby league second-rows
Rugby league five-eighths
Rugby league players from Lower Hutt
Rugby union players from Lower Hutt
People educated at St Bernard's College, Lower Hutt
Wainuiomata Lions players
Wellington rugby union players